Xwejni Bay is a bay located in the northern part of Gozo, Malta, within the limits of the village of Żebbuġ. It is used as a bathing bay and starting point for divers. The nearest place on the coast is Marsalforn. The bay has a small pebbly beach, and at the west of the bay is an upstream plateau with a double arch and a cave along the coast.

References 

Żebbuġ, Gozo
Bays of Malta